Accotink Creek is a  tributary stream of the Potomac River in Fairfax County, Virginia, in the United States. At Springfield, Virginia, Accotink Creek is dammed to create Lake Accotink. The stream empties into the Potomac at Gunston Cove's Accotink Bay, to the west of Fort Belvoir.

Variant names
According to the Geographic Names Information System, it has also been known historically as:  
Accotonck Creek
Main Branch

Course
Accotink Creek rises near the intersection of Rt. 66 and Rt. 123 in Fairfax County, Virginia.  Accotink Creek then flows southeast to meet the Potomac River in Accotink Bay at Fort Belvoir Military Reservation.

Watershed
Accotink Creek drains  of area, receives about 43.7 in/year of precipitation, has a topographic wetness index of 436.37 and is about 22.5% forested.

See also
List of crossings of Accotink Creek
Accotink, Virginia
List of rivers of Virginia

Maps

References

External links
Friends of Accotink Creek
FCPA - Lake Accotink Park

Rivers of Fairfax County, Virginia
Fairfax, Virginia
Tributaries of the Potomac River
Springfield, Virginia